William Jackson (March 9, 1759 – December 17, 1828) was a figure in the American Revolution and one of the Founding Fathers of the United States. He served as secretary to the 1787 United States Constitutional Convention, and as part of his duties added his signature to the United States Constitution. He also served with distinction in the Continental Army during the Revolutionary War. After the war, he served as one of President George Washington's personal secretaries.

Early life

Born in the county of Cumberland, England, Jackson was sent to Charleston, South Carolina, after his parents died. He was raised by a family friend and prominent merchant, Owen Roberts, who was the commander of a militia battalion. After the war broke out in 1775, Roberts joined the Patriot side, and the teenaged Jackson followed; Roberts probably helped Jackson to obtain a position as a cadet in the 1st South Carolina Regiment. In May 1776 Jackson was commissioned as a second lieutenant.

Military service
Jackson first saw action near Charleston in June 1776, when his regiment fought off General Sir Henry Clinton's attempted attack on Fort Sullivan. The unit then spent a long period garrisoning the city of Charleston, during which Charles Cotesworth Pinckney assumed command of the 1st South Carolina. Late in 1777, Jackson was part of the detachment that made an ill-conceived and poorly conducted expedition against St. Augustine in British East Florida under Major General Robert Howe. The expedition was a colossal failure, and the American force was struck down by disease. Jackson survived and returned to South Carolina in 1778.

After returning from Florida, the Southern regiments were placed under the command of Major General Benjamin Lincoln from Massachusetts. Pinckney convinced Lincoln that as a Northerner, he needed an aide to assist him in relating to his Southern troops. Jackson was chosen for this position and was temporarily promoted to the rank of major. As Lincoln's aide he saw action in the Battle of Stono Ferry and the Siege of Savannah in 1779. In 1780, General Lincoln surrendered his troops after the lengthy siege of Charleston. As a captured officer, Jackson was shipped to Philadelphia, then held by the British. After a few months he was returned to the Continental Army in an exchange of prisoners.

Diplomatic role
A skilled staff officer, Jackson was then assigned to General Washington's staff, serving as secretary to the general's aide John Laurens, son of Henry Laurens of South Carolina. When Laurens was sent to France in 1781 armed with a memorial written by Washington outlining why a sizable loan (25 million livres) was needed, he took Thomas Paine and Jackson, who had a good command of French. For six weeks,  they dealt unsuccessfully at Versaille with Foreign Affairs Minister Vergennes, a longtime diplomat who wanted England tied up in an American war but knew the precarious situation of France's own finances.  

Finally, against Benjamin Franklin's advice, direct contact was made with the king, and Washington's memorial was handed to him.  The following day the king directed Finance Minister Jacques Necker to meet with them.  The loan was made, the bulk of it for military supplies, 3 million in gold specie, with the promise that France would underwrite with Dutch agents a later loan for 10 million should it be needed. Purchases began, and by early May Laurens sailed with 3 ships and Jackson went to Holland where John Adams had contracted with a captain for a fourth ship.  That ship vanished, either because Adams had been deceived about the honesty of the captain or because the British Navy, with orders to hunt down all four ships, had sunk it.  The three ships, however, arrived in Boston in early September.  

Jackson returned to the United States in February 1782 and was assistant secretary of war under Benjamin Lincoln. After helping settle the Pennsylvania Mutiny of 1783, he resigned his office and his commission in October 1783 to become Robert Morris's agent in England.

Constitutional Convention
 When Jackson returned the next year, he studied the law with Philadelphia lawyer William Lewis. As an impoverished law student, Jackson wrote to Washington in 1787 applying for the post of secretary to the Philadelphia Convention. On the Convention's first day of business, May 25, 1787, Alexander Hamilton nominated Jackson to the post, and the delegates chose him over William Temple Franklin, Benjamin Franklin's grandson, despite the latter's experience serving as his grandfather's secretary during the Treaty of Paris negotiations.

As the Convention secretary, Jackson was responsible for maintaining the secrecy of the Convention's proceedings, keeping official minutes, and destroying many of the proceedings' other records. He signed the document "Attest William Jackson Secretary" to attest to four corrections which had been made to the document.

Jackson was sent to the Congress of the Confederation, assembled in New York City, with a copy of the Constitution, and was honored to read it out to the Congress just days after the signing, on September 20, 1787.

Later career

Major Jackson was admitted to the Pennsylvania Bar in 1788, but in those days, he had to wait two years to practice before the Pennsylvania Supreme Court, the most lucrative branch of the law; besides this, he was an (unpaid) volunteer in the Second Philadelphia Light Horse. He applied to be secretary of the United States Senate, but Samuel Allyne Otis was appointed. He then applied to be personal secretary to George Washington when he became President of the United States, writing that he had unpaid expenses as a Continental officer and that business was "not congenial to [his] temper."

He resigned as secretary in 1791 to restart his law practice and work as agent for William Bingham and Secretary of War Henry Knox, who were selling off a large land grant in Maine first acquired by William Duer, first Undersecretary of the Treasury and now bankrupt. Jackson's job was selling land on commission in England and France; among his potential customers was the Committee of Public Safety. They declined to invest their scant funds in Maine land; but Jackson wrote a very favorable report on them back to the United States.

He returned to the United States in the summer of 1795 and married Elizabeth Willing, Mrs. Bingham's sister, in November; they were the oldest daughters of Thomas Willing, a rich Philadelphia merchant, related to the Shippens. In January 1796 (during his last months in office), Washington, who had gone to the wedding, appointed Jackson Collector for the Port of Philadelphia. Thomas Jefferson, another wedding guest, dismissed him in 1801 for politicizing his office. Jackson then started a Federalist newspaper, the Political and Commercial Register, in Philadelphia and edited it until 1815.

Society of the Cincinnati
Jackson succeeded Henry Knox in 1799 as secretary general of the Society of the Cincinnati, a group of former Continental Army officers. On behalf of the remaining officers of the war, he headed an unsuccessful effort to lobby Congress to grant all veteran Revolutionary officers half-pay for life in 1818. Congress was to pass such a bill in 1826, fifty years after independence, but Jackson was not associated with it; his last public appearance was welcoming the Marquis de Lafayette to Philadelphia in 1824. He remained secretary general of the society until his death.

Death 
On December 18, 1828, at age 69, Jackson died in Philadelphia. He is interred in Christ Church Cemetery in Philadelphia, along with his wife.

See also
 Samuel Osgood House — First Presidential Mansion.
 Alexander Macomb House — Second Presidential Mansion.
 President's House (Philadelphia) — Third Presidential Mansion.

References

Dube, Ann Marie. May 1996. A Multitude of Amendments, Alterations and Additions: The Writing and Publicizing of the Declaration of Independence, the Articles of Confederation, and the Constitution of the United States. National Park Service. Online: .
"George Washington's Household in Philadelphia, 1790-1792." Independence Hall Association. Online: .
Vile, John R. "Jackson, William." Constitution Day Reference Library. ABC CLIO. Online: .
Harry M. Ward. "Jackson, William"; American National Biography Online Feb. 2000. Access Date: Tue Oct 13 18:26:02 EDT 2009
Wright, Robert K. and MacGregor, Morris J., Jr. 1987. "William Jackson." Soldier-Statesmen of the Constitution. United States Army Center of Military History.

1759 births
1828 deaths
American Revolutionary War prisoners of war held by Great Britain
Continental Army staff officers
People from Cumberland
Politicians from Charleston, South Carolina
Secretaries
Personal secretaries to the President of the United States
Signers of the United States Constitution
People of South Carolina in the American Revolution
British emigrants to the Thirteen Colonies
Burials at Christ Church, Philadelphia
People of colonial Pennsylvania
Founding Fathers of the United States